Randall de Jager (4 April 1971 – 22 December 2001) was a South African actor. He was best known for his roles in the popular serials Egoli: Place of Gold and 7de Laan.

Personal life
He was born on 4 April 1971 in the suburbs of Bishop Lavis, Cape Town, South Africa. At the age of 17, he became a Sunday school teacher and very close with the church. He was survived by his mother, Jean and had two sisters: Juanita, Angelique and a brother, Roger.

He had a long-standing affair with his girlfriend, Kim Nichols.

Death
Early on 22 December 2001, Jager was fatally wounded in an armed robbery at a house in the luxury suburb of River Club, in Sandton, north of Johannesburg. He was succumb to death at the Johannesburg hospital. He was with his friend and actress Helene Lombard during the robbery. He was shot in the face and declared brain dead at the hospital.

His remains were moved to Bishop Lavis in Cape Town for final rites. His memorial service was held at the New Apostolic church on 29 December.

Career
In 1992, he played in the theater play Paradise is Closing Down. In 1998, he became a scriptwriter, where he wrote the play Moenie Try Nie.

He is known for the role 'Hector' in the television soap opera Egoli: Place of Gold. He also played the role of bookshop assistant Aubrey Rudolph in the popular television soapie 7de Laan.

Filmography

References

External links
 

1971 births
South African male television actors
20th-century South African male actors
South African male film actors
South African male stage actors
2001 deaths
Deaths by firearm in South Africa
21st-century South African male actors